Austria competed at the 1980 Winter Paralympics in Geilo, Norway. 34 competitors from Austria won 22 medals including 6 gold, 10 silver and 6 bronze and finished 3rd in the medal table.

Alpine skiing 

The medalists are:

  Gerhard Langer, Men's Slalom 2B
  Brigitte Madlener, Women's Giant Slalom 3B
  Josef Meusburger, Men's Slalom 2A
  Peter Perner, Men's Giant Slalom 1A
  Peter Perner, Men's Slalom 1A
  Markus Ramsauer, Men's Giant Slalom 2A
  Anton Berger, Men's Slalom 2B
  Hubert Griessmaier, Men's Slalom 3A
  Heidi Jauk, Women's Slalom 2A
  Gerhard Langer, Men's Giant Slalom 2B
  Brigitte Madlener, Women's Slalom 3B
  Josef Meusburger, Men's Giant Slalom 2A
  Markus Ramsauer, Men's Slalom 2A
  Christine Winkler, Women's Giant Slalom 1A
  Christine Winkler, Women's Slalom 1A
  Anton Berger, Men's Giant Slalom 2B
  Anton Ledermaier, Men's Slalom 2B
  Franz Meister, Men's Giant Slalom 1A
  Brigitte Rajchl, Women's Giant Slalom 1A
  Dietmar Schweninger, Men's Slalom 3A
  Ursula Steiger, Women's Slalom 1A

Cross-country 

Seven athletes represented Austria in cross-country skiing. The medalists are:

  Bruno Geuze, Horst Morokutti, Franz Perner, Josef Scheiber Men's 4x5 km Relay 3A-3B

See also 

 Austria at the Paralympics
 Austria at the 1980 Winter Olympics

References 

Austria at the Paralympics
1980 in Austrian sport
Nations at the 1980 Winter Paralympics